Trigonochloa is a genus of Asian and African plants in the grass family.

 Species
 Trigonochloa rupestris (C.E.Hubb.) P.M.Peterson & N.Snow - Ethiopia, Eritrea, Somalia, Kenya, Uganda, Yemen
 Trigonochloa uniflora (Hochst. ex A.Rich.) P.M.Peterson & N.Snow - Ghana, Benin, Nigeria, West Congo, Uganda, Kenya, Tanzania, Ethiopia, Mozambique, Angola, Zambia, Zimbabwe, Botswana, Namibia, South Africa, Yemen, India, Sri Lanka

References

Chloridoideae
Poaceae genera